VV:2, also known as Venomous Villain, is the fourth studio album by British-American rapper and producer MF Doom, and the second and final album to be released under his alias Viktor Vaughn. It was released through Insomniac, Inc. on August 3, 2004.

Critical reception

At Metacritic, which assigns a weighted average score out of 100 to reviews from mainstream critics, VV:2 received an average score of 71 based on 11 reviews, indicating "generally favorable reviews".

Exclaim!s Thomas Quinlan found the album to be "a great follow-up to Vaudeville Villain", while noting that due to its short length and the presence of numerous guest performers, it nonetheless "leaves you wishing for a lot more DOOM".

Critic Robert Christgau ranked the album at number 71 on his year-end "Dean's List".

Track listing

Personnel
Credits adapted from album's liner notes.

Personnel
 Israel "Iz-Real" Vasquetelle – executive producer, A&R
 Thomas D. Jenkins – co-executive producer
Divinci – mixing

Artwork
 Sanford Greene – artwork
 Gez Fry – additional coloring

References

External links
 

2004 albums
MF Doom albums
Sequel albums